Michael H. S. Good (1 July 1875 – after 1904), sometimes known as Micky Good, was a Scottish professional footballer who made 71 appearances in the Football League playing for Small Heath, Preston North End and Bristol City.

Good was born in Airdrie, which was then in Lanarkshire. He played for Airdrie Hill and for Airdrieonians before joining Small Heath in 1896. A short, stockily-built forward, able to cover the half-back positions as well, he made his debut in the Second Division on 19 December 1896, playing at right half in a 2–0 defeat away at Loughborough. He had a run of games at inside right at the end of the 1897–98 season and the beginning of the next, but failed to score enough goals. He moved to Southern League club Watford in 1898, in 1901 returned to the Football League with Preston North End, and spent 1902 with Bristol City, where he made 35 appearances in all competitions. He then returned to the Southern League with successively Reading, Brighton & Hove Albion and Southern United.

References

1875 births
Year of death missing
Footballers from Airdrie, North Lanarkshire
Scottish footballers
Association football forwards
Airdrieonians F.C. (1878) players
Birmingham City F.C. players
Watford F.C. players
Preston North End F.C. players
Bristol City F.C. players
Reading F.C. players
Brighton & Hove Albion F.C. players
English Football League players
Southern Football League players
Place of death missing
Southern United F.C. players